Baltimora was an Italian music project, active from 1984 to 1987

Baltimora may also refer to:

 Baltimora (plant), genus of flowering plants in the sunflower family.
 Baltimora (singer), an Italian singer-songwriter and record producer

See also 
 Baltimore (disambiguation)